Jacinto Bienvenido Peynado Garrigosa  (9 March 1941 – 9 August 2004) was a businessman and politician who served as Vice President of the Dominican Republic from 1994 to 1996.

Biography
His father was Enrique Peynado Soler (son of the late president Jacinto Peynado y Peynado and Mercedes Soler Machado), and his mother was Miguelina Olimpia Garrigosa Thormann (daughter of Miguel Garrigosa Gallardo and Olimpia Thormann Lamarche).

He married Margarita Altagracia Álvarez Sorrentino, the daughter of Jaime Tomás Álvarez Valverde (1915–1993) and Margarita Sorrentino Visonne, an immigrant from Secondigliano, Italy.

Peynado Garrigosa chaired the commercial society Commercial Delta, a company founded by his father, which was car dealership in Dominican Republic of the automakers Toyota, Lexus and Volvo.

He was senator to the National Congress for the National District during the 1986–1990 and 1990–1994 periods; Vice-President of the Republic in the trimmed term comprised between 1994 and 1996. In 1996 he was the presidential candidate of the Social Reformist Party Christian (PRSC), but he finished in third place in the election as he did not receive the support of the PRSC's adherents. In the 2000 presidential election, Peynado was the running mate of Joaquín Balaguer.

Peynado died in Miami on 9 August 2004 as consequence of a cancer. His widow, Margarita Álvarez de Peynado, was the vicemayor of the Dominican capital city from 2002 to 2016 and deputy to Roberto Salcedo.

Family tree

See also

1941 births
2004 deaths
Deaths from cancer in Florida
Dominican Republic people of Catalan descent
Dominican Republic people of Cuban descent
Dominican Republic people of French descent
Dominican Republic people of German descent
Candidates for President of the Dominican Republic
Members of the Senate of the Dominican Republic
Social Christian Reformist Party politicians
Vice presidents of the Dominican Republic
White Dominicans
20th-century Dominican Republic politicians